John Parr is the self-titled debut album by John Parr, released in 1984. It contains 3 Billboard Top 100 songs: "Magical" which peaked at #73, "Love Grammar" at #89, and the biggest of the three, "Naughty Naughty", which peaked at #23 and was a top 10 AOR hit.

"St. Elmo's Fire (Man in Motion)" is included on the 1985 London Records issue of the album (#LONLP 12) in the UK. It hit number one on the Billboard Hot 100 on September 7, 1985, remaining there for two weeks. It was the main theme for the Joel Schumacher's 1985 film St. Elmo's Fire. The song also peaked at number six in the UK, Parr's home country and became a number-one hit for John Parr around the world and provided many awards and a Grammy nomination.

Track listing

Personnel
John Parr – lead vocals, lead guitar, African sounds
Pete Solley – Hammond organ
Christopher Marra – guitar
Brad Lang – bass guitar 
Colin Farley – bass guitar 
John Cook – keyboards
Richard Cottle – keyboards 
Johnathon J. Jeczalik – Fairlight synthesizer
The Kick Horns – horns
Graham Broad – drums, percussion
Simon Phillips – drums 
Chuck Kirkpatrick – backing vocals
John Sambataro – backing vocals
Steve Lukather - guitar 
David Paich - keyboards 
Steve Porcaro - keyboards
Production
Mark Dodson – engineer
Femi Jiya – engineer
Geoff Lyth – engineer
Ian Morais – engineer
David Thoener – engineer
John Verity – engineer
John Parr – producer
Pete Solley – producer
David Foster – producer 
Jimmy Starr – remastering

Charts

Album

Singles

References 

1984 debut albums
John Parr albums
Rhino Records albums